Barnabáš Lacík (born 6 May 2002) is a Czech footballer who currently plays as a midfielder for FC Zbrojovka Brno.

Club career

FC Zbrojovka Brno
He made his professional debut for Zbrojovka Brno in the away match against Ústí nad Labem on 26 September 2021, which ended in a win 6:1. After 78 minutes he replaced Jan Hladík.

References

External links
 Profile at FC Zbrojovka Brno official site
 Profile at FAČR official site

2002 births
Living people
Czech footballers
FC Zbrojovka Brno players
Association football midfielders
Footballers from Brno
Czech Republic youth international footballers